N10 may refer to:

Roads
 N10 (South Africa)
 N10 highway, Philippines
 N10 road (Ghana)
 N10 road (Ireland)
 Makran Coastal Highway, Pakistan
 Nebraska Highway 10, United States
 Route nationale 10, France

Vehicles 
 LNER Class N10, a class of British steam locomotives
 Nieuport 10, a French sesquiplane
 Nissan Pulsar (N10), a Japanese car
 Toyota Hilux (N10), a Japanese pickup

Other uses
 Intel i860 XR, a microprocessor
 Interstitial nephritis
 London Buses route N10
 Nitrogen-10, an isotope of nitrogen
 Northern 10 Athletic Conference
 N10, a postcode district in the N postcode area for London

See also
 10N (disambiguation)